Spiked drink may refer to:

 A mixed drink to which alcohol has been added
 A Mickey Finn, a drug-laced drink given to someone without their consent with the intent to incapacitate them